Ibon Koteron (born in Bilbao in 1967) is a Basque musician renowned as a player of the alboka. His 1996 debut release was a joint record with Kepa Junkera, entitled Leonen Orroak (the roarings of Leon, a homage to the great albokalari Leon Bilbao).

He was educated in a Jesuit school in Bilbao where he was known for his expertise playing chess and his anarchist tendencies. He graduated in Basque philology in the University of Deusto, but he is now teaching Philosophy in IES Ategorri, Erandio.

His career as musician started after he studied alboka and dultzaina in 1987-88 and became a teacher of these instruments himself. In the early 1990s, forming a duo with his brother, he started playing, often for free, as an accompanist to numerous popular acts, notably in support of the Conscientious Objection Movement, which was then waging a popular disobedience campaign against conscription and the army itself.

He has published many articles on the alboka and is developing a multimedia method to learn to play this unique instrument.

In 2004 he released a second record entitled Airea (the air), produced by Kepa Junkera.

He has also collaborated with other musicians, including Gilles Chavenat, Soledonna and Faltriqueira, Heikki Syrjänen, Andrea Pisu and Roston Kuchichian.

He leads a band that includes the following musicians:
Iñaki Plaza – percussions, txalaparta, trikitixa
Ion Garmendia – percussions, txalaparta, xirula
Belen Fernandez – cello, voice
Unai Frantsesena – keys, percussions, txalaparta
Ibon Koteron – alboka, flute, voice

External links
Brief biography

1967 births
Basque musicians
Basque-language singers
Living people
People from Bilbao
Alboka players
20th-century Spanish singers
21st-century Spanish singers
20th-century Spanish male singers
21st-century Spanish male singers